Aloe helenae is a species of plant  in the genus Aloe. It is endemic to Madagascar.

References

Sources

helenae
Critically endangered plants
Endemic flora of Madagascar
Taxonomy articles created by Polbot